The University of Eastern Finland is a university in Finland founded in 2010 with campuses in Joensuu and Kuopio.

History
The Finnish Parliament passed the Universities Act on June 16, 2009, which, among other things, extended the autonomy of Finnish universities by giving each university an independent legal personality, as a public corporation or a foundation. Also, universities’ management and decision-making systems were reformed.

Merger
2006 - The University of Joensuu and the University of Kuopio decided to intensify their mutual cooperation as part of the Ministry of Education program addressing the structural development of Finnish higher education institutions. The project for the University of Eastern Finland was selected as one of the Ministry of Education spearhead projects.  The project formed a working group led by Professor Reijo Vihko.

2007 - Professor Reijo Vihko's working group submitted a report proposing that cooperation between the two universities be further intensified. The two universities' senates formally agreed to merge, thereby forming a new university, deciding on its name, the University of Eastern Finland, a few weeks later.

2008 - The organization structure and strategy of the University of Eastern Finland were completed. The University of Joensuu and the University of Kuopio received a joint right to confer degrees in Economics and Business Administration.

2009 - The first joint student admissions to the University of Eastern Finland were carried out in Economics and Business Administration and in Social Sciences in 2009.  On May , 2009 The Sino-Finnish Environmental Research Centre (SFERC), a collaborative undertaking of the University of Joensuu, the University of Kuopio, and the University of Nanjing, focused on higher education and research addressing forestry, energy and environmental issues, opened in Nanjing, China, the first such unit established by a Finnish university in China. SFERC operates at the University of Nanjing campus as a permanent satellite campus for the University of Eastern Finland.

2010 - The University of Eastern Finland formally began operations in January 2010, which formally ended the operations of the University of Joensuu and of the University of Kuopio. The University of Eastern Finland began offering dentistry education in 2010.

Locations

Administration
The administration of the University of Eastern Finland is overseen by its Board, the Rector and the Academic Rector, its Collegiate Body, and its Faculty Councils and their Deans. The university's practical administrative tasks fall to the staff of University Services.

Board

The Board of the University of Eastern Finland is the university's highest executive organ. The Board of the University of Eastern Finland is composed of a total of 10 members, 4 of whom are external members. Board members serve 3-year terms.

Rector and Academic Rector

The University of Eastern Finland has a Rector and an Academic Rector, each of which is based at the opposite main campus of the university from the other.

Collegiate Body

The Collegiate Body of the University of Eastern Finland consists of 24 members, eight each representing the university's professors, its teaching, research and general staff, and its student body. Members serve 4-year terms, except for those representing the student body, who serve 2-year terms.

Faculty Councils and Deans

The University of Eastern Finland has four faculty councils: 1) the Philosophical Faculty, 2) the Faculty of Science, Forestry and Technology, 3) the Faculty of Health Sciences, and 4) the Faculty of Social Sciences and Business Studies, each headed by a dean.

Research and education
The University of Eastern Finland is a multidisciplinary university. The four faculties of the UEF offer teaching in nearly 100 major subjects and degree programs. The university's annual student intake is approximately 2,200 and the university attracts nearly 24 000 applications for admission every year. The university offers Bachelor's, Master's and doctoral level education in 13 fields of study: pharmacy, dentistry, humanities, education, economics and business administration, natural sciences, medicine, forest sciences, psychology, theology, health sciences, social sciences, and law.

Profile areas in research

The profile areas in research of the University of Eastern Finland are built around four global challenges:

 Ageing, lifestyles and health
 Diversifying learning and interaction
 Cultural encounters, mobilities and borders
 Environmental change and sustainable use of natural resources.

The University of Eastern Finland approaches the above-mentioned challenges through research carried out within its interdisciplinary Research Communities (RCs). The university's Research Communities are:
 Basic, Translational and Clinical Cardiovascular Medicine 
 Borders, Mobilities and Cultural Encounters 
 Climate Forcing, Ecosystems and Health 
 Drug Discovery and Delivery Technologies 
 Effectiveness of Social and Health Services 
 Forests and Bioeconomy 
 Learning in Digitalized Society 
 Metabolic Diseases  
 Multidisciplinary Cancer Research 
 Musculoskeletal Diseases 
 Neuroscience 
 Photonics
 Sustainable Co-management of Water Resources and Aquatic Environments
 Sustainable Resource Society: Circular Economy, Energy and Raw Materials

International cooperation
The University of Eastern Finland is an international research university with an extensive network of foreign partners. The university has concluded bilateral agreements on cooperation with approximately 70 universities abroad. Furthermore, the university is involved in several international networks and discipline-specific projects, and the university's teaching and research staff and students are active in participating in various mobility programmes.

Statistics
The University of Eastern Finland has a total staff of about 3,200 and 16,000 students.

The Finnish Ministry of Education and Culture granted the University of Eastern Finland the right to confer degrees in the field of law as from 1 August 2013, expanding the university's fields of study to a total of 13, and making the university the most multidisciplinary university in Finland.

Rankings

Since launching its operations in 2010, the University of Eastern Finland has appeared frequently, indeed annually, in several rankings listing the world's leading universities although losing position at almost every ranking in the last years. In the rankings of the world's top universities under 50 years of age published by QS World University Rankings and Times Higher Education World University Rankings, the University of Eastern Finland was ranked #71-80 by QS (2021), and 49th by THE (2019).

In 2023, the University of Eastern Finland was ranked among the leading 601-800 universities in the world by Times Higher Education. In QS World University Rankings 2023, the University of Eastern Finland was ranked among the leading 551-560 universities in the world. In the 2020 Academic Ranking of World Universities published by Shanghai Jiao Tong University, the University of Eastern Finland was ranked among the leading 501–600 universities in the world., all reflecting a lower trend.

See also
 Kuopio University Hospital

References

External links

 
Eastern Finland
Joensuu
Kuopio
Buildings and structures in North Karelia
Buildings and structures in North Savo
2010 establishments in Finland
Universities and colleges formed by merger in Finland